Christian Valdemar Svendsen (13 July 1890 – 28 June 1959) was a Danish gymnast who competed in the 1912 Summer Olympics. He was part of the Danish team, which won the bronze medal in the gymnastics men's team, free system event.

References

External links
profile

1890 births
1959 deaths
Danish male artistic gymnasts
Gymnasts at the 1912 Summer Olympics
Olympic gymnasts of Denmark
Olympic bronze medalists for Denmark
Olympic medalists in gymnastics
Medalists at the 1912 Summer Olympics